Smoke Tree Range is a 1937 American Western film directed by Lesley Selander and written by Frances Guihan. The film stars Buck Jones, Muriel Evans, John Elliott, Dick Jones, Donald Kirke, Ted Adams and Ben Hall. The film was released on June 6, 1937, by Universal Pictures.

Plot

Cast       
Buck Jones as Lee Cary
Muriel Evans as Nan Page
John Elliott as Jim Cary
Dick Jones as Teddy Page
Donald Kirke as Wirt Stoner
Ted Adams as Gil Hawkins
Ben Hall as Pete
Mabel Colcord as Ma Kelly
Earle Hodgins as Sheriff Day 
Bob Kortman as Henchman Paso Wells
Edmund Cobb as Sandy
Eddie Phillips as Sandy's friend
Robert McKenzie as Storekeeper Dick 
Slim Whitaker as Henchman Ferguson
Silver Jr. as Silver

References

External links
 

1937 films
1930s English-language films
American Western (genre) films
1937 Western (genre) films
Universal Pictures films
Films directed by Lesley Selander
American black-and-white films
1930s American films